Nunkiang,  was a province in Northeast China, which was established in 1945. It was c.26,000 sq mi/67,340 km² large and the provincial capital was Qiqihar. The province was abolished in 1950 and incorporated with Heilongjiang province.

See also
 

Provinces of the Republic of China (1912–1949)
Manchuria
States and territories established in 1945
1950 disestablishments in China
Subdivisions of Manchukuo